Slađan Perić (born 15 April 1982) is a Danish former professional footballer who played as a defender.

Playing career
Perić, born in Denmark to Serbian parents, started his career as a youth player in the two clubs in Copenhagen, B93 and KB. His time in KB resulted in the club winning the Danish Championship for youth teams in 2000, which draw a lot of attention to the talented team, even from abroad. This led to Peric being offered a contract from the German Bundesliga club Schalke 04. But the new surroundings proved difficult for him, and he left Gelsenkirchen after two years and returned to Denmark. He turned his back on soccer for a short period and concentrated on getting an education, but when his childhood club B93 offered him a contract, soccer became his main priority again. He then played one season in the club and later joined Herfølge Boldklub. In 2005 Perić signed a contract with Vejle Boldklub, where he made his debut on 3 August 2005 against HIK.

References

External links
 

Living people
1982 births
Danish people of Serbian descent
Danish men's footballers
Association football defenders
Boldklubben af 1893 players
FC Schalke 04 players
Herfølge Boldklub players
Vejle Boldklub players
FC Vestsjælland players
Skovshoved IF players
Danish expatriate men's footballers
Danish expatriate sportspeople in Germany
Expatriate footballers in Germany